MBC Drama may refer to:
 Television drama series broadcast by Middle East Broadcasting Center (headquartered in Dubai, UAE)
 MBC Drama (Middle East and North Africa)
 MBC Plus Drama, a defunct television channel
 Television drama series broadcast by Munhwa Broadcasting Corporation in South Korea